Abdullah Zeydan (born 13 March 1972 in Yüksekova) is a Turkish politician of Kurdish descent and a member of the Peoples Democratic Party (HDP).

Education 
He attended primary school and high school in Yüksekova in the Hakkari Province.

Political career 
Abdullah Zeydan was elected as a member of the Grand National Assembly of Turkey in the general elections of June 2015 representing Hakkari and re-elected on the snap elections in November of the same year.

Juridical prosecution 
He was imprisoned on the 4 November 2016 together with fellow HDP deputies and charged for having attended funerals of members of the Kurdistan Workers' Party (PKK) but also the Peoples Protections Forces (YPG) who fought against the Islamic State of Iraq and the Levant (ISIL). Abdullah Zeydan was imprisoned in the F-type prison in Edirne together with Selahattin Demirtaş, with who he joined a hunger strike in protest of the detention conditions in March 2017. He also joined an other hunger strike in protest of the detention conditions of Abdullah Öcalan, which was initiated by Leyla Güven. He was to take part in it for 10 days. He was punished for this the same month by the prison authorities, but Öcalan was permitted a visit of his brother  days after Zeydan joined the hunger strike. In January 2018, Abdullah Zeydan was sentenced to 8 years imprisonment for allegedly supporting a terrorist organization making terrorist propaganda. In November 2019, a court ruled he be released. But this decision was opposed by the prosecutor of Diyarbakır on the same day, following which the court reconsidered and decided to keep him imprisoned. The State Prosecutor to the Court of Cassation in Turkey Bekir Şahin filed a lawsuit before the Constitutional Court on the 17 March 2021, demanding for Zeydan and 686 other HDP politicians a five-year ban to participate in politics. The lawsuit was filed together with the request for a closure of the HDP due to the parties alleged organizational links with the PKK.

On the 6 January 2022, after having attended a hearing in Elâzığ, Zeydan was released from prison.

Personal life 
He is married to Dilsah Zeydan and the couple has three daughters. He is the son of Mustafa Zeydan, a former deputy of the Justice and Development Party (AKP)

References 

1972 births
Kurdish politicians
Deputies of Hakkâri
Living people
Politicians arrested in Turkey
People from Hakkâri Province
Turkish Kurdish politicians
Peoples' Democratic Party (Turkey) politicians